Pangunahing Balita is a Philippine television news broadcasting show broadcast by ABC and PTV. it premiered on March 19, 1962, and concluded on ABC on September 22, 1972. The show returned on October 26, 1987, on PTV replacing Early Evening Report. The show concluded on October 30, 1998, it was replaced by Pambansang Balita Ala-Sais in its timeslot.

History

ABC 5 (1962–1972)
Premiered on March 19, 1962, Pangunahing Balita was the first Filipino-language late afternoon newscast of ABC 5 (now TV5). Anchored by Paul Lacanilao, the newscast aired the news of the day in the local and international scene. It also inspired other TV stations to introduce a Filipino-language newscast, for example Balita Ngayon of ABS-CBN, which aired from 1967 to 1972. On September 22, 1972, DZTM-TV 5 was closed down due to declaration of martial law.

Timeslot
It was aired in the late afternoon slot, and had 2 editions. The first edition aired at 4:30 pm, while the final edition aired at 5:45 pm.

PTV 4 (1987–1998)
In 1987, PTV 4 launched Pangunahing Balita as its Filipino-language newscast. The noontime program became the household name for their Tagalog newscast.

Anchors
Paul Lacanilao (ABC 5 "now TV5") (1962–1972)
Erwin Tulfo (PTV 4) (1987–1995)
Katherine De Leon-Vilar (PTV 4) (1992–1995).
Daniel Razon (PTV 4) (1995–1998)
Precious Hipolito-Castelo (PTV 4) (1995–1998)
Dada Lorenzana (PTV 4) (1995–1998)

References

See also
List of programs aired by TV5 (Philippine TV network)
List of programs aired by People's Television Network

TV5 (Philippine TV network) news shows
People's Television Network original programming
1960s Philippine television series
1970s Philippine television series
1980s Philippine television series
1990s Philippine television series
1962 Philippine television series debuts
1972 Philippine television series endings
1987 Philippine television series debuts
1998 Philippine television series endings
Filipino-language television shows